Brendan Richard O'Neill (born 6 December 1948) is a British business executive.

O'Neill was educated at West Park Grammar School, St Helens, and studied natural sciences at Churchill College, Cambridge (MA) before completing his PhD in Chemistry at the University of East Anglia. He served as CEO of ICI from 1999-2003, having previously been CEO of Diageo from 1997-1998. He has held directorships at Informa, Aegis Group, Guinness, United Distillers and EMAP, is a Fellow of the Chartered Institute of Management Accountants, and is a Trustee of Cancer Research UK.

References

1948 births
Alumni of Churchill College, Cambridge
Alumni of the University of East Anglia
British chief executives
Imperial Chemical Industries executives
People from St Helens, Merseyside
Living people